Michael Hayes Thompson (born April 16, 1985) is an American professional golfer who plays on the PGA Tour. He has won two tournaments on the PGA Tour, with the most recent one coming at the 2020 3M Open.

Amateur career
Thompson attended University High School in Tucson, Arizona from 1999 to 2003. While there he won the Class 4A state team championship in 2003, and was named the Arizona High School State Player of the Year in 2002 and 2003. Thompson attended Tulane University two seasons until they disbanded their golf team after Hurricane Katrina. Thompson then transferred to the University of Alabama. While playing on Alabama's golf team, Thompson was the 2008 SEC Player of the Year.

Thompson was a finalist in the 2007 U.S. Amateur, but was defeated by Colt Knost 2 & 1. This earned him invitations to the 2008 Masters Tournament and the 2008 U.S. Open. He missed the cut in the Masters but was the low amateur at the U.S. Open at Torrey Pines. He scored a nine-over-par 292 to finish in 28th place. The following week he was invited to play in the Travelers Championship, where he made the cut and shot a three-under-par 277 to finish tied for 58th.

Professional career
Thompson spent one week as number one in the World Amateur Golf Ranking before turning professional in July 2008. In 2010 Thompson played on the Hooters Tour, and was named the 2010 Hooters Tour Player of the Year. In the 2010 PGA Tour Q-School, Thompson finished tied for 16th, which earned him a 2011 PGA Tour card.

After earning his spot through sectional qualifying, Thompson led after the first round of the 2012 U.S. Open after shooting a four-under par round of 66, which included seven birdies, to lead by three strokes. This was the low round of the week. He followed this up with rounds of 75–74 to enter the final round six back of the leaders. Thompson then completed a three-under par round of 67 to hold the clubhouse lead at +2, until Webb Simpson bettered it by a stroke. Thompson finished tied for second with Graeme McDowell to record his best finish in a major championship. Thompson moved up over 50 places in the Official World Golf Ranking (OWGR) to 52nd with this finish.

After a number of players withdrew due to injury or personal reasons, Thompson earned entry into the 2012 Open Championship as an alternate due to his OWGR ranking. He went on to miss the cut.

Thompson earned his first PGA Tour win at the 2013 Honda Classic. The win moved Thompson to a career-high 45th in the OWGR, up from 114th before the tournament.

After 2013, Thompson only had a combined three top ten finishes. After finishing 145th in the FedEx Cup in 2016, he played in the Web.com Tour Finals and won the Albertsons Boise Open.

On July 26, 2020, Thompson won the 3M Open at TPC Twin Cities just outside of Minneapolis, Minnesota. The win gave Thompson an exempt status on the Tour for two years and spots in both the WGC-FedEx St. Jude Invitational and the PGA Championship. Prior to the win, Thompson only had one other top-10 finish in the 2019–20 PGA Tour season, finishing T8 at the RBC Heritage. He missed the cut at the Workday Charity Open two weeks before the tournament, and finished outside of the top 45 in his other two appearances on Tour once play resumed after the COVID-19 hiatus. He missed the cut in seven of his first 11 appearances in the 2019–20 season, but at the first round of the 2020 Players Championship on March 12 at Sawgrass, Florida, Thompson shot a bogey-free 68, before the tournament was cancelled and the PGA Tour took a three-month break.

Personal life
Thompson attained the rank of Eagle Scout in the Boy Scouts of America while in high school. He is married to Rachel Thompson, who is a Doctor of Physical Therapy, and an Emory University graduate. She caddied for Thompson during his only win on the regular Hooters Tour. The two met while attending Tulane University together.

Thompson and his wife have together adopted two children, in 2016 and 2020 respectively.

Professional wins (4)

PGA Tour wins (2)

Web.com Tour wins (1)

NGA Hooters Tour wins (1)
 2010 Michelob Ultra Classic

Results in major championships
Results not in chronological order in 2020.

LA = Low Amateur
CUT = missed the half-way cut
"T" = tied
NT = No tournament due to COVID-19 pandemic

Summary

Most consecutive cuts made – 2 (2008 U.S. Open – 2012 U.S. Open)
Longest streak of top-10s – 1

Results in The Players Championship

CUT = missed the halfway cut
"T" indicates a tie for a place
C = Canceled after the first round due to the COVID-19 pandemic

Results in World Golf Championships
Results not in chronological order before 2015.

1Cancelled due to COVID-19 pandemic

NT = No tournament
"T" = Tied

U.S. national team appearances
Amateur
Palmer Cup: 2008

See also
2010 PGA Tour Qualifying School graduates
2015 Web.com Tour Finals graduates
2016 Web.com Tour Finals graduates
2018 Web.com Tour Finals graduates

References

External links

Profile on University of Alabama's official site

American male golfers
Tulane Green Wave men's golfers
Alabama Crimson Tide men's golfers
PGA Tour golfers
Korn Ferry Tour graduates
Golfers from Arizona
Golfers from Louisiana
Golfers from Birmingham, Alabama
Sportspeople from Tucson, Arizona
1985 births
Living people